Dhandoli  is a village in Phagwara Tehsil in Kapurthala district of Punjab State, India. The village is administrated by a Sarpanch, who is an elected representative.

Demography 
According to the report published by Census India in 2011, Dhandoli has 43 houses with the total population of 208 persons of which 107 are male and 101 females. Literacy rate of Dhandoli is 72.93%, lower than the state average of 75.84%.  The population of children in the age group 0–6 years is 27 which is 12.98% of the total population.  Child sex ratio is approximately 350, lower than the state average of 846.

Population data

Transport 
Phagwara Junction and Mauli Halt are the closest railway stations to Chachoki; Jalandhar City railway station is 23 km away from the village.  The village is 114 km away from Sri Guru Ram Dass Jee International Airport in Amritsar and the closest airport is Sahnewal Airport in Ludhiana which is located 43 km distant.

References

External links
  Villages in Kapurthala
 Kapurthala Villages List

Villages in Kapurthala district